Barry Manilow is the debut album by Barry Manilow, released initially in 1973 by Bell Records.

The original release was unsuccessful, with only around 35,000 copies sold by 1975. After the success of Manilow's second album Barry Manilow II, the album was re-released as Barry Manilow I in 1975 by Arista that had taken over Bell Records. Four songs of the original album were reworked for this version, including "Could It Be Magic" which served as the single for the re-release. The re-released album was certified gold by the RIAA in 1976 for over half a million copies sold.

Track listing 
All tracks composed by Barry Manilow; except where indicated.

Original 1973 release
 Issued on Bell Records as Barry Manilow
Side 1
"Sing It"
"Sweetwater Jones"
"Cloudburst" (Jimmy Harris, Jon Hendricks, Leroy Kirkland)
"One of These Days"
"Oh My Lady" (Manilow, Adrienne Anderson)
"I Am Your Child" (Manilow, Marty Panzer)
Side 2
"Could It Be Magic" (inspired by Prelude in C Minor, Frédéric Chopin; Manilow, Adrienne Anderson)
"Seven More Years" (Manilow, Marty Panzer)
"Flashy Lady" (Marty Panzer, Ron Dante)
"Friends" (Buzzy Linhart, Mark Klingman)
"Sweet Life"

1975 reissue
 Issued on Arista Records as Barry Manilow I
"Sweet Life", "Could It Be Magic", "One of These Days" and "Oh My Lady" were re-recorded at Mediasound Studios, NYC, April 1975 for the re-release on Arista Records.
This version was also remastered and re-issued by Arista Records again in 1989 on CD and Cassette tape.

Side 1
"Sing It" - 1:16
"Sweetwater Jones" - 2:31
"Cloudburst" - 2:25
"One of these Days" - 2:50
"Oh My Lady" - 3:28
"I Am Your Child" - 2:14
Side 2
"Could It Be Magic" - 6:50
"Seven More Years" - 3:35
"Flashy Lady" - 3:53
"Friends" - 3:05
"Sweet Life" - 3:47

2006 remaster
 CD remastered reissue by Arista (Bell Label on Disc) Records as 1973's Barry Manilow with bonus tracks and original cover art.
"Sing It"
"Sweetwater Jones"
"Cloudburst"
"One of these Days"
"Oh My Lady"
"I Am Your Child"
"Could It Be Magic"
"Seven More Years"
"Flashy Lady"
"Friends"
"Sweet Life"
Bonus tracks
<li>"Caroline" (Manilow, Anderson)
<li>"Rosalie Rosie" (Manilow, Anderson)
<li>"Star Children"
<li>"Let's Take Some Time to Say Goodbye" (Arthur Schroeck)

Personnel
Barry Manilow - vocals, piano, arrangements, conductor
Dick Frank - electric guitar
Stuart Scharf - acoustic guitar
Stu Woods - bass
Steve Gadd - drums
Norman Pride - congas, tambourine
with:
Russell George - bass on "Sweetwater Jones", "I am Your Child" and "Sweet Life"
Bob Babbitt - bass on "Flashy Lady"
Bob Mann, Ron Dante - guitar on "Flashy Lady"
Andrew Smith - drums on "Flashy Lady"
Jimmy Maelen - percussion on "Flashy Lady"
Joseph "Grandpa Joe" Manilow - vocals on "Sing It"
Gail Kantor, Melissa Manchester, Merle Miller, Ron Dante, Adrienne Anderson, Jane Scheckter, Jane Stuart, Kathe Green, Laurel Massé, Pamela Pentony, Robert Danz, Sheilah Rae - backing vocals
Technical
Elliot Scheiner - recording, mixing
Jerome Gasper - recording on "Sweetwater Jones", "I am Your Child" and "Sweet Life"
Artie Friedman - remixing on "Sweetwater Jones"
Beverly Weinstein - art direction
Ken Duncan - cover photography

Chart positions
Billboard Albums
1975: Barry Manilow I - Billboard 200 No. 28

Billboard Singles
1975: "Could It Be Magic" - Adult Contemporary No. 4
1975: "Could It Be Magic" - Billboard Hot 100 No. 6

Certifications

References

Barry Manilow albums
1973 debut albums
Bell Records albums
Arista Records albums
Albums produced by Ron Dante